Last Recording (MGM Records, 1959) is final album Billie Holiday recorded. It was originally released during Holiday's lifetime with the title Billie Holiday, and was retitled after her death. It is not to be confused with the 1954 Clef Records album titled Billie Holiday.

Content
After the success of her album, Lady in Satin (1958), Billie Holiday wanted to record another album with arranger Ray Ellis. Ellis had switched from Columbia to MGM, so Billie switched labels also to avoid breaching her contract with Columbia.  When she returned to the studio in March 1959, jazz critic and friend of Holiday's Leonard Feather, said Holiday "walked into the studio statuesque and sharp as ever."

When Holiday recorded her previous album Lady in Satin with Ellis, she conveyed to him her desire to “sound like Sinatra”, but at the time was in such poor health from years of difficulty and substance abuse that a nurse sometimes had to help keep her propped up on a high stool as she sang. Billie Holiday was a departure from the stylings of her more string laden previous album, making use of a lighter string orchestra, minus the choir, and more horns, including a saxophone and a more jazz like feeling. It also demanded less fanfare. Songs like "All of You", "'Deed I Do", and "Baby Won't You Please Come Home" have a lighter and happier tempo and do not include strings.

During the time of recording Billie Holiday, Holiday's health was taking its toll. Some say that she did not look like herself at all, and looked like a ghost of what she once was.

In the song "There'll Be Some Changes Made", Holiday replaces the name Jack Benny in the lyric "Even Jack Benny has been changin' his jokes" to Frank Sinatra, her jazz friend.

The album was completed on March 11, 1959. Four days later, Billie Holiday's lifelong friend and music partner Lester Young died on March 15, 1959. She would die four months later on July 17, 1959, at the age of 44.

Allmusic music critic Ron Wynn gave the album one and half stars out of five stating, "In many ways, a sad event... It's poignant in a tragic way." The Penguin Guide to Jazz Recordings awards the album three stars, but places the entire rating in brackets, indicating that the authors had reservations about the album as a whole.

Voice
By 1959, use of hard drugs and alcohol had taken their toll on Holiday's voice. It is evident that her voice had deteriorated since her previous album Lady in Satin. Producer and arranger Ray Ellis said that the producers "accidentally" adjusted the speed at 1/4 pitch faster in the studio making Holiday's voice high pitched in some songs like "You Took Advantage of Me".

Track listing 
 "All of You" from Silk Stockings - (Cole Porter) -2:30
 "Sometimes I'm Happy" from Hit the Deck  - (Irving Caesar, Clifford Gray, Vincent Youmans)  -2:46
 "You Took Advantage of Me" from Present Arms  - (Richard Rodgers, Lorenz Hart)  - 2:46
 "When It's Sleepy Time Down South"  from Safe in Hell - (Leon René, Otis René, Clarence Muse) - 4:04
 "There'll Be Some Changes Made" - (W. Benton Overstreet, Billy Higgins) - 2:52
 "'Deed I Do" - (Walter Hirsch, Fred Rose) - 2:14
 "Don't Worry 'bout Me" -  (Ted Koehler, Rube Bloom) - 3:08
 "All the Way" from The Joker Is Wild  -  (Sammy Cahn, Jimmy Van Heusen) - 3:22
 "Just One More Chance" -  (Sam Coslow, Arthur Johnston) - 3:43
 "It's Not for Me to Say" - (Al Stillman, Robert Allen) - 2:25
 "I'll Never Smile Again" - (Ruth Lowe) - 3:23
 "Baby Won't You Please Come Home" - (Charles Warfield, Clarence Williams) - 3:03

Personnel
Billie Holiday - vocals
Ray Ellis - arranger & conductor
Harry Edison - trumpet
Joe Wilder - trumpet
Billy Byers - trombone
Gene Quill - alto saxophone
Al Cohn - tenor saxophone
Danny Bank - baritone saxophone
Hank Jones - piano
Barry Galbraith - guitar
Milt Hinton - bass
Osie Johnson - drums

References

1959 albums
Billie Holiday albums
MGM Records albums
Albums arranged by Ray Ellis
Albums produced by Ray Ellis
Albums published posthumously
Verve Records albums